Mahieddine "Tchico" Meftah (born 25 September 1968 in Tizi Ouzou) is a former Algerian national footballer. He is one of the most capped Algerian player (with 77 national caps).

Honours

Club
 JS Kabylie
 Ligue 1 (3): 1988-89, 1989-90, 1994-95
 Algerian Cup (2): 1992, 1994
 Algerian Super Cup (1): 1992
 African Cup of Champions Clubs (1): 1990
 African Cup Winners' Cup (1): 1995

 USM Alger
 Ligue 1 (3): 2001-02, 2002-03, 2004-05
 Algerian Cup (5): 1997, 1999, 2001, 2003, 2004

National team
 Algeria national football team
 African Cup of Nations (1): 1990
 Afro-Asian Cup of Nations (1): 1991

Career statistics

Club

References

External links

 

1968 births
Living people
Footballers from Tizi Ouzou
Kabyle people
Algerian footballers
Algeria international footballers
JS Kabylie players
USM Alger players
1990 African Cup of Nations players
1992 African Cup of Nations players
1996 African Cup of Nations players
1998 African Cup of Nations players
2000 African Cup of Nations players
2002 African Cup of Nations players
Africa Cup of Nations-winning players
Association football defenders
21st-century Algerian people